The Sorcerers is a 1967 British science fiction/horror film directed by Michael Reeves, starring  Boris Karloff, Catherine Lacey, Ian Ogilvy, and Susan George. The original story and screenplay was conceived and written by John Burke. Reeves and his childhood friend Tom Baker re-wrote sections of the screenplay, including the ending at Karloff's insistence, wanting his character to appear more sympathetic. Burke was removed from the main screenwriting credit and was relegated to an 'idea by'.

Plot
Dr. Marcus Monserrat (Boris Karloff) is an elderly practitioner of  medical hypnosis. He lives with his wife Estelle Monserrat (Catherine Lacey). He has invented a device which would allow him to control and feel another person's experience using the power of hypnosis. 

They decide any youngster will do as their test subject. Dr. Marcus Monserrat selects and invites Mike Roscoe (Ian Ogilvy) to his house, with an offer of a 'new experience'. He uses the device on Mike and the procedure is successful: He and Estelle can feel everything Mike feels, and can also control him.

After the procedure, they decide to send Mike away to conduct the experiment over distance. Mike returns to the club where his girlfriend Nicole (Elizabeth Ercy) is waiting for him. Mike takes Nicole to his apartment, and they swim in the pool. 

Marcus and Estelle are able to experience everything Mike feels. While Marcus wants to publish his work, Estelle wants to make up for lost time and to experience new things. She convinces a reluctant Marcus to continue with their arrangement with Mike.

Next day, Estelle sees a fur jacket in a store and convinces Marcus to use Mike to steal the jacket. Marcus reluctantly agrees on the condition that they will not do it again. While Mike is at Nicole's apartment, Estelle and Marcus make Mike steal the jacket. Mike leaves without informing Nicole, who decides to go a night club with Alan (Victor Henry). Despite a cop getting involved, Mike successfully steals the jacket.

Estelle realizes that they could do anything they want without any consequences. Estelle wants to experience the thrill of speed. So Estelle and Marcus make Mike borrow Alan's bike and ride very fast with Nicole on the pillion seat. When Alan confronts Mike, Estelle makes Mike assault him and his boss, Ron (Alf Joint). 

Estelle enjoys the experience but Marcus is shocked. He tries to prevent the fight but Estelle's mind turns out to be stronger. When Marcus confronts Estelle, Estelle assaults Marcus and destroys the experimental device, thereby preventing Marcus from reversing the experiment.

Mike blanks out every time Estelle and Marcus control him. A confused Mike visits his friend Audrey (Susan George), but Estelle makes Mike kill her. Mike then goes to the night club and hooks up with pop singer Laura (Sally Sheridan). Alan and Nicole see Mike taking Laura out of the night club. The couple are dropped by a taxi in a deserted street where Mike orders Laura to sing. When she fails to follow his instructions, he kills her too.

The following day, Alan tells Nicole he believes Mike might have killed the girls. Alan wants to inform the police but Nicole convinces him to talk to Mike first. The police track Mike with help of the taxi driver. Alan and Nicole confront Mike about Laura but Mike does not remember anything. 

Under the influence of Estelle, Mike attacks Alan again and escapes in a car. Police investigators track down Mike, and in the ensuing chase, Marcus interferes with Estelle's control. Mike's car crashes and catches fire. Back at the apartment, Estelle and Marcus are both dead due to burn injuries.

Cast
 Boris Karloff as Professor Marcus Monserrat 
 Catherine Lacey as Estelle Monserrat 
 Elizabeth Ercy as Nicole 
 Ian Ogilvy as Mike Roscoe 
 Victor Henry as Alan 
 Sally Sheridan as Laura Ladd
 Alf Joint as Ron, the mechanic 
 Meier Tzelniker as the Jewish baker 
 Gerald Campion as customer in China shop 
 Susan George as Audrey Woods 
 Ivor Dean as Inspector Matalon
 Peter Fraser as the detective

Reception

At Internet Movie Database, the film received an average score of 6.4 out of 10.

For her performance, Catherine Lacey won a 'Silver Asteroid' award as Best Actress at the Trieste Science Fiction Film Festival in 1968.

The Sorcerers: The Original Screenplay
After John Burke's death in 2011, his estate sent two boxes of effects to John's friend, editor Johnny Mains. Looking through the material he discovered that it contained the original screenplay which was markedly different from the finished film. Burke had already told Mains about Michael Reeves denying him a screenwriting credit, but included in the boxes were several lawyers letters pertaining to the fact that this was the case. Mains then approached PS Publishing who agreed to publish the original screenplay, treatment, letters and other ephemera. The finished book, with an introduction by Matthew Sweet and additional material from Kim Newman, Benjamin Halligan and Tony Earnshaw, was published in October 2013.

References

External links

 
 

1967 films
1967 horror films
British science fiction horror films
1960s science fiction horror films
Films directed by Michael Reeves
British independent films
Films set in London
1967 independent films
Films with screenplays by Michael Reeves
1960s English-language films
1960s British films